The Lada Niva Legend, formerly called the Lada Niva, VAZ-2121, VAZ-2131, and Lada 4×4, is a series of four-wheel drive, small (hatchback), and compact (wagon and pickup) off-road cars designed and produced by AvtoVAZ since 1977. Initially aimed at the rural market, later models also targeted urban users. The three- and later five-door 4×4 hatchbacks were sold under the Lada marque in many markets, and have been in continuous production since 1977.

In the 1990s, three and five-door wagons on a  longer wheelbase and an extra-long wheelbase pick-up were added to the range. After the original Land Rover and its successor, the Land Rover Defender, were discontinued in 2016, the Niva became the longest production run off-road light vehicle still manufactured in its original form. By the end of 2020, an estimated 650,000 Lada Nivas had been sold globally.

The Lada Niva is the world's first mass-produced off-road vehicle with a unibody construction (fully integrated body and frame). It is the predecessor of current crossover SUVs, most of which are built similarly. It was part inspiration for the Suzuki Vitara.

In August 2020, Lada took over production of the 2003 Chevrolet Niva and rebranded it the "new" Lada Niva. In December 2020, the new Niva was further rebranded as the Lada Niva Travel, while the old model was renamed Lada Niva Legend in January 2021.

Outside Russia, the Niva primarily competes with the Suzuki Jimny, a similarly designed off-road mini SUV.

Name
Нива (Niva) is a Russian word that literally means "(corn) field", but also "area of practice". The name Niva (НИВА) was formed as an acronym from the initials of Niva's chief designers' children: Pyotr Prusov's two daughters and Vladimir Solovyev's two sons.

The Lada Niva was formerly called the Lada 4×4, or the VAZ-2121 in the domestic Russian market. The name was changed after the brand was transferred to General Motors, though AvtoVAZ retained the rights to the equivalent Cyrillic name: Нива. It was also marketed as the Lada Sport in Iceland, Lada Taiga in Austria, Bognor Diva in Uruguay, and Lada Cossack in the United Kingdom. In 2014, it was sold as the LADA 4×4 in Russia. Since 2021, it is sold as the Lada Niva Legend in Russia.

History

Prototypes and testing
The Niva was described by its designers as a "Renault 5 put on a Land Rover chassis". Development began in 1971 after the 24th Congress of the CPSU, in which Alexei Kosygin (the then-Premier of the Soviet Union) gave the designers at VAZ and AZLK the task of creating a car suitable for rural areas (specifically for the villagers and farmers of the Soviet Union), since the usual Zhiguli, Moskvitch, and Zaporozhets, intended primarily for ordinary people, were not much of use in the isolated areas that made up a large part of the USSR. In the same year, a team of VAZ designers led by Solovyev began competing with AZLK to work on a "civilized" four-wheel drive vehicle. The new car was partly inspired by the IZh-14 prototype of 1974. It was VAZ's first model that was not based on Fiat, though many of its mechanics were carried over from the earlier Fiat 124- or 125-based Zhiguli models (mostly the VAZ-2103 and 2106); the body, four-wheel drive system, and front suspension were all designed by VAZ. The first prototype appeared in 1971 and was officially designated the E-2121 and nicknamed krokodil (the crocodile) due to its distinctive frontal section, but was rejected for being too utilitarian, so doors and a hardtop were added. This version (designated the 2E-2121) debuted in 1973 and deviated from the off-road vehicles of the period, as it used a modern hatchback body. The design choice was inspired by the prototype known as the VAZ-1101 (itself derived from the Fiat 127), and was created by designer Valery Pavlovitch.

The influence of the Fiat 127 is obvious from the Niva's distinctive "clamshell" hood design and its rear three-quarter section. The 1974 prototype (designated the VAZ-2121M) was derived from an existing model, the VAZ-2103 (then the newest model in VAZ arsenal). It used the VAZ-2103's 1,452 cc engine and shared some of its features, like chrome-plated bumpers, headlights and taillights, instruments, seats, and steering wheel. In the following year, two samples of the prototype were modified to install a 1,478 cc UZAM-412 engine, which originally powered the Moskvich 1500. Testing later revealed that the engine was incompatible with the newly designed car. The Moskvich engine was abandoned, and the older engine was reused. The 1974 prototype (2121M) was ready to be mass produced in 1975, but the appearance of the new VAZ-2106 at the end of the year resulted in a delay because the company wanted to develop another prototype based on the model in 1976, which became the sixth and final (serial production) prototype.

Before its production, the Niva was tested over a period of years by a team led by Vadim Kotlyarov in the most difficult terrain of the Soviet Union, such as the Ural Mountains and Siberia, the deserts of the Kazakh SSR, and the Pamir Mountains in the Tajik SSR, where it was compared with its military counterpart, the UAZ-469, and some Western off-road vehicles—the British-made Land Rover Series and the Range Rover Classic. Its off-road capabilities were demonstrated for the very first time, which were based on its effective permanent four-wheel drive system featuring a transfer case and central differential lock, with the combination of a short wheelbase (only 2,2m), relatively low weight (just over a ton), independent suspension, small dimensions (3,74×1,68 m), and high ground clearance (about 265 mm). Its large but narrow wheels (175/80-R16 in dimensions), originally featuring domestically designed "Voltyre" VLI-5 high-tread tires, offered relatively strong ground pressure, which lowered the chances of slipping or getting bogged down off-road. Solovyev died the following year and was replaced by engineer Pyotr Prusov, who took credit for creating the car.

In 1976, the final prototype appeared. The engine was changed to a  one, the most powerful engine in VAZ during the Soviet era, taken from their VAZ-2106 (from which the production model of the first Niva generation was generally derived). Like the previous prototype, it featured a permanent four-wheel drive and a transfer case with a lockable central differential. The VAZ prototype displayed better design and real-world performance than its AZLK counterpart, the Moskvitch 416, so it was approved for production in March of the same year, after the 25th Congress of the CPSU. The car was named Niva 1600 (Field) for exports and the VAZ-2121 (alternatively "Niva 2121" or "VAZ Niva") for the domestic market. For domestic customers, it was described as "[a] high-speed car with the improved capabilities and comfort of all VAZ models," and also as "[a] combination of the speed and comfort of a Zhiguli with the capabilities of a UAZ." Production began the following year on 5 April 1977, while the first export models appeared in 1978 at the Paris Motor Salon and quickly took over at least 40% of Europe's market for four-wheel drive vehicles, making it Lada's top-selling export. It was the only Soviet car that was ever sold in Japan, starting from the early 1980s, inspiring their Suzuki Samurai. Because of export demand and the higher priority given to exports, domestic customers faced long wait times, despite the car being developed primarily for Soviet citizens.

Design

The original Niva has a normally aspirated 1.6-L overhead-cam four-cylinder petrol engine producing 56 kW (76 hp) and 126 N·m (93 lb·ft) at 5,000 rpm, a four-speed manual transmission, and a full-time four-wheel drive. The drive system uses three differentials: center, front, and rear. The transfer case involves a high/low range selector lever and another to lock the central differential. Like usual gear shifting, both of the aforementioned features naturally require the use of clutch to be properly selected. However, while the central differential can usually be locked while in motion, the transfer case cannot and requires a complete stop.

Coil springs are located at each of the four wheels, and the suspension is independent in front, whereas the rear axle is a five-link live-type, with ratios between 3.90 and 4.30 depending on the model and market. Ground clearance is 235 mm (9.25 in), and go as far as 510 mm (20 in) deep in water.

The brakes are servo-assisted dual-circuit style and the clutch is hydraulic. The turning circle is 36.25 ft. Cargo space is 0.48 m³ (17 ft³), or 1.33 m³ (47 ft³) with the rear seats folded down and, like the classic Zhiguli, the front seats can be set up to make two berths. A spare tire can be stored in the engine bay under the bonnet.

Additional equipment for the basic model was similar to other Lada and Eastern Bloc cars of the period; it included headlight wipers, a rear fog lamp, a right external mirror (for domestic units until the end of the 1980s), rear seat belts, a rear window wiper, a rear window heater, and a radio set. On the Niva 1.7 or VAZ-21213 from 1994, all of the above features except headlight wipers and the rear fog lamp (which were discontinued) became default and air conditioning, an antilock braking system, and a hydraulic servomotor for the steering column were made optional, although they became standard equipment on the newest models.

Foreign (usually Western) local Lada importers often offered their own additional equipment before buying the car, such as front and rear bull bars and roll bars, side rocker rails, roof rails, a winch, fender plastics, additional headlights for front bumper and for roof rails, and aftermarket aluminium rims, which can be often seen mounted on many Nivas.

The existing model was slightly restyled during first half of the 1980s when VAZ discontinued the VAZ-2103 (which had slowly been replaced by the VAZ-2106 since 1975). Due to high prices and production complexity, some of the chrome-plated elements disappeared in later models, such as the chrome-plated mask and rocker panel edges. Other elements were changed, such as the side mirrors, which became black metallic. The background of the front Lada badge was changed from red to white (and later black on the new model) on all models. The side rear retroreflectors (or turn signals on some models, depending on market) were replaced by Lada (left) and Niva (right) labels, and the rear mudflaps received the brand logo. For easier access to certain areas of the engine compartment, the window washer reservoir was moved from the left to the right section of the compartment (right in front of the battery). The interior was only minimally changed, along with some minor changes to the instrument panel and choke knob.

Pre-1985 models are visually recognized by the aforementioned details, and are rare today (almost nonexistent in a well-preserved condition), so they are highly valued by various collectors of classic cars. A mint-condition 1980 unit in Russia reached a price of five million RUB and ultimately sold for 3,2 million in 2016 (approximately €38,570 or $44,570), which remains the most expensive Niva ever sold.

The VAZ-2121 Niva or Lada Niva 1600 was in production until 1993 (it existed in parallel production with the new model until the end of 1993) when the newer and more powerful four-cylinder petrol engine was introduced, replacing the previously-used VAZ-2106 engine. The standard Weber carburetor was replaced by a single-point fuel injection initially supplied by General Motors on the 21214/1.7i model, and an improved Solex carburetor on the 21213/1.7 model. The transmission was changed from four to five speeds, mechanical ignition was replaced, and the electronics and suspension received some relatively minor changes. The exhaust system was also slightly redesigned, and on newer models, the drive shafts received homokinetic joints.

On the exterior, the rear section of the body was redesigned with the tailgate extended and license plate on it. These changes prompted new vertical taillights that replaced the former VAZ-2106 horizontal ones and the VAZ-2102 chromed tailgate knob, which was replaced by a simple plastic handle. On the newest models, the old hand-adjustable, square black-metallic (previously chrome-plated) side mirrors, which originated from the VAZ-2103 were replaced with larger plastic ones that could be automatically adjusted.. The previous front Lada badge was replaced with the larger ellipsoid design. The Fiat 125 chrome-plated doorknobs are still present, though they are plastic on the newest models. Although the rest of the exterior has remained generally unchanged (except for the Lada 4×4 Urban and Bronto), the interior was almost completely redesigned and shares only a few interchangeable parts with the previous one: the archaic partially chrome-plated VAZ-2106 steering wheel was replaced with the more modern and thick one from the VAZ-2107 and later, even newer models, as well as its VAZ-2103/2106 instruments, which were replaced with the dashboard from the VAZ-21099. The black artificial leather seats that originated from the VAZ-2106 were replaced by higher, more modern ones from the VAZ-2108, with the front surface made of polyester, while the rear seat was improved for easier folding. The Fiat 124 swiveling windows from the side doors disappeared and were replaced with air conditioning, which was installed with the ABS and servomotor for the steering column as additional equipment on request, while the headlight wipers and rear fog lamp disappeared. It received completely new front and door panels (with interior door knobs relocated above the hand rests instead of under like on previous generation), various plastics and even new floor mats. The hand openings for the side-door windows was replaced with an automatic opening on the newest models (and on the Lada 4×4 Urban) starting from 2014. Multipoint fuel injection designed by Bosch has been used since 2004, replacing the previously mentioned single-point injection from General Motors.

Later models
The lengthened model of the Niva appeared in 1993. It was known as the VAZ-2129 and was produced very briefly, only for about a year, so it is very rare. It was also never exported. Although it has a longer wheelbase, it kept three doors like the basic hatchback model. In design, it was a hybrid of old and new generations, since it featured the old VAZ-2121 (Niva 1600) body and interiors combined with new VAZ-21213 (Niva 1.7) 1680-cc engine and 5-speed transmission (although later, 1994 production models featured even new body and interiors).

The lengthened estate model with a longer wheelbase and five doors was made in 1995. It was originally known as the VAZ-2131 Niva, but commercially, it has no difference in name from the standard three-door model, and it is often referred as the Niva five-door. Due to its increased weight from the longer wheelbase, it can use the 1774-cc inline four petrol engine. Although it was still in production like the basic model, it had limited use and was infrequently exported, mainly due to the longer wheelbase and increased weight, and it was slightly higher priced compared to the standard model. In 2015, a five-door model also appeared for the Lada 4×4 Urban.

In 1999, a diesel-engine model of the Niva known as the VAZ-21215 Niva, or commercially as the Lada Niva 1.9, was released. It was produced until 2007 and sold only in a few markets. It was powered by a 1905-cc Peugeot XUD 9SD inline four diesel engine, and it was less powerful than the standard VAZ-21213/21214 1680-cc petrol engine. However, the VAZ-21215 was a relatively short-lived model despite lower fuel consumption, because it was not popular in the domestic market, Peugeot stopped producing XUD engines in 2001 (although existing supplies were available until 2007, when the last VAZ-21215 came off the production line), and VAZ did not make another contract for diesel engine production for the Niva.

In 2006, the model with the carbureted engine of the new generation (VAZ-21213/Lada Niva 1.7) was discontinued, and the name Niva was formally dropped in favor of the new official name Lada 4×4, as General Motors received naming rights. The Niva was discontinued under the old Soviet VAZ-2121 domestic market classification.

In 2014, the new, restyled model called the Lada 4×4 Urban was released. It has more modern, ordinary looks, including a new mask, plastic bumpers, new side mirrors, different aluminium rims, new tires, a central brake light, heated front seats, and a slightly restyled interior. As of 2019, no version of the Lada 4x4 has airbags.

In 2017, the Lada 4×4 Bronto, intended mainly for off-road use, is released. It features characteristic mask and plastic bumpers with integrated front and rear fog lamps, plastic roof rails, new, larger wheels with black aluminium rims and 235/75-R16 Bontyre Stalker off-road tires, even higher ground clearance (increased another 35 mm) and plastic rust-protected body edges (fenders and rocker panels). Internally, it is similar to the Lada 4×4 URBAN, also featuring heated front seats. It also includes a front winch, roof headlights, and additional fog lights on the front bumper. With all the mentioned equipment included, the Bronto is currently the most expensive Lada 4×4 model, with a current price of 720 thousand RU in the domestic market (around €10,130). The slightly different pickup model designed by VIS was also revealed (featuring an integrated metallic grille, different bumpers, and a snorkel), called the Lada Bronto AMC.

On 5 April at the car's 40th anniversary, a special, limited edition of the classic Lada 4×4 called the Lada 4×4 40th-Anniversary was presented, which used the 1977 design. It features new aluminium rims similar to the Urban, five new color schemes, "40th Anniversary" metallic labels on the fenders, a tailgate, a glove compartment cover, front-seat backrests, and floor mats. Also, it has a slightly restyled interior featuring genuine leather seat upholstery and a steering wheel cover, and sills made out of stainless steel. The model is available from June 2017 in both domestic and export markets.

A convertible version appeared back in 1983, but was neither serially produced nor designed by VAZ. It was a modification of the original Niva 1600 bodied by French coachbuilder Wassermann for the local market. It was known as the Niva Plein Soleil (Sunlight) and it was one of many Niva modifications made by local importers for their markets.

In recent years, changes included better lights, more comfortable seats, an instrument panels with LCD displays, alloy wheels, electric windows and mirrors, heated seats and air conditioning.

Cossack and other importer special editions

During the 1980s, local Lada importers in various markets made their own upgrades to help compete with more modern SUVs. In the UK, the Cossack model featured large body decals, roof rails, running boards, 15-in alloy wheels, and on some versions, a sunroof, steel bullbars, spotlights, a rear-mounted spare tire, and semi-bucket seats. Other markets' importers made similar upgrades and many were also called Cossack.

In 1995, Lada UK introduced a face-lifted version of the Niva Cossack and renamed the basic model as the Hussar. Whereas the Hussar had the original 1977 trim, the new UK Cossack featured a new Rover-designed grille and other body kit items, and gained soft nudge-bars at the front in deference to public opinion against bullbars. Both models received the same new 1.7-litre engine and a new deeper tailgate which extended the rear opening to the level of the bumper – a vast improvement over the original model's high lip. Official Niva imports to the UK ceased in 1997 due to the importers having difficulty in sourcing the GM fuel injection unit required to satisfy ever-tightening UK emissions regulations.

Several attempts were made to reintroduce Ladas into the UK. In May 2010, the basic Niva became available again through an independent importer. Aimed largely at the agricultural market, three models were made available: the three-door, four-seat hatchback; a two-seat commercial van; and a two-door, four-seat pickup.

VAZ-2122 Reka

Although VAZ was meant exclusively to produce passenger cars, the Soviet military was impressed by its off-road capabilities and ordered VAZ to create a military version, to replace the UAZ-469 as the standard military 4×4 vehicle. In 1976, when VAZ-2121 development was almost finished, engineers from Tolyatti began working on an amphibian off-roader, which became known as VAZ-2122 Reka (River). A simplified and more rugged body was combined with the Niva chassis. It weighed about the same as the usual Niva, but instead of the 1600-cc VAZ-2106 engine, it used an older and less powerful 1300-cc engine derived from the VAZ-2101. Internally, it featured a different metal dashboard, though it used the same Niva instruments along with the same steering wheel and artificial leather seats.

Six different evolution prototypes were built. They were tested in an experimental military unit, on the proving grounds of the Ministry of Defense, and in the Karakum Desert in Turkmenistan. The VAZ-2122 showed better results than the UAZ-469 (especially the fact that it featured amphibious capabilities, which UAZ did not have) and received very positive feedback; the military was satisfied with its capabilities, reliability, firmness and durability. By 1987, VAZ had completed development work, and the car was ready for mass production and military service. Nevertheless, the results were not enough to convince the military to start mass production.

LWB Nivas

Longer wheelbase versions – the five-door VAZ-2131, three-door VAZ-2129, and VAZ-2329 pickup were also produced from the 1990s, but not generally exported.

Nameplate changes
The Lada Niva was formally renamed Lada 4×4 back in 2006 and has a low-range gearbox, differential lock, ABS, airbags, heated front seats, air conditioning, servomotor for the steering column, underbody protection. Prices for the model started at €10,990. It is available in five body styles: three- and five-door hatchbacks, two- and four-door pickups, and a two-door van. Two petrol engines are available for the model – the standard 1.7-litre and the 1.8-litre (only for five-door model) along with a five-speed manual transmission.

Starting with the 2014 model year, the Niva nameplate was discontinued for the Russian market, and the vehicle is branded Lada 4×4 for both short and long wheelbases to make way for the upcoming restart of the Chevrolet Niva series, which was scheduled to start production by March 2015. Due to Russia–West economic relations, AvtoVAZ analysts suggested that the production of Chevrolet Niva may be delayed further into 2015.

2003 – 2019

GM-AvtoVAZ, a joint venture between AvtoVAZ and General Motors, produces the Chevrolet Niva. It features an updated body and 1.7-litre gasoline engine with fuel injection. Although the body and the interiors are new, it is still based on the old VAZ-2121 engine, transmission, and most mechanicals. Its off-road ability is exemplary compared with many modern budget SUVs, having been designed for tough tundra territory. In August 2020 Lada took over production of the Chevy Niva rebranding it as the Lada Niva.

2020– 

In 2019 Lada acquired General Motors' stake in GM-AvtoVAZ and then announced that the Chevrolet Niva would be produced under Lada's name. The rebranded Lada Niva was revealed by AvtoVAZ in July 2020, with the firm saying that there was still strong demand for the 20 year old line of cars. The 2020 model is produced at the Togliatti factory with minor design updates (but no technical changes) and joins the Lada 4×4 in the firm's range.

In December 2020, following a new generation of the line, the new Lada Niva was further rebranded as Lada Niva Travel, while the old Lada 4x4 was rebranded as the Lada Niva Legend in January 2021.

Safety by modern standards
In 2002, the Lada Niva was awarded zero stars out of a possible four by the Russian ARCAP safety-assessment program. The reviewer noted the very rugged body of the car as the only positive aspect in terms of safety. During the safety test, the passenger dummy was hit by the glove compartment hard enough to risk traumatic brain injury.

The reviewers noted that they did not expect a high rating and that the result was natural, as "it would be naive to believe that a 30-year-old design complies with modern requirements for passive safety". They added that a complete modernization of the car would be required to comply with modern safety standards.

Uses

The Niva was the first wheeled vehicle to spend more than 10 years in Antarctica, where the classic VAZ-2121 Niva (Lada Niva 1600) was used by the Soviet Antarctic Expedition for transportation of personnel and goods, communication between Antarctic stations, and towing boats. It covered more than 40,000 km (24,855 miles) in 1990–2001 and operated at temperatures as low as −54 ℃. A Niva also reached the North Pole in 1998, when the lengthened VAZ-2131 Niva was dropped by parachute on ice and successfully completed its route, operating at an average temperature of −30 ℃, becoming the first wheeled vehicle to spend time there. It also set the world record of the highest point ever reached by a motorized vehicle, when another VAZ-2131 climbed to the 5200-m-high base camp on Mount Everest in 1998 and even higher just a year later, on 16 September 1999, when a similar Niva belonging to the Saint Petersburg extreme expedition team reached a height of 5725 m on a Tibet mountain during off-roading.

Assembly outside Russia

Automeccanica assembled different versions of the Lada Niva in the late 1980s and early 1990s, including an in-house developed convertible version.

The Lada Niva was also assembled in Ecuador by Aymesa between December 2000 and 2004.

Concept cars

Chevrolet Niva Concept (2014)
In August 2014 at the Moscow International Automobile Salon, GM-AvtoVAZ introduced the next generation Niva. The car had a longitudinal mounted engine, full-time four-wheel-drive, two-gear transfer case and rigid-axle rear suspension. The production model was supposed to get a 1.8-liter PSA Peugeot Citroën EC8 engine (135 hp) paired with a 5-speed manual gearbox. The production was expected to start in 2016, but GM had no interest in the model.

Lada 4x4 Vision Concept (2018)
In May 2018 AvtoVAZ patented the new concept car called the Lada 4x4 Vision. At a Moscow International Automobile Salon in August 2018, AvtoVAZ presented the concept, built in honour of the original Niva's 40th anniversary. According to preliminary information, the car would be based on Renault Duster and production is  scheduled to start in 2022 at the earliest.

Modifications

Short/regular versions

Lada 4×4 Urban 
A version of the base three-door car, it sports updated bumpers, grille, steering wheel, and some additional options: power and heated mirrors, power windows, air conditioning, and alloy wheels. The car has been produced by VIS-Auto since October 2014.

Vehicles based on the Niva

VAZ-1922 Bronto "March-1" 
Bronto March is one of the few mass-produced vehicles on ultra-large-diameter pneumatic wheels. A production is being made by the PSA Bronto in Tolyatti since 1997. In the first 8 years of production, about 350 cars were produced.

APAL-21541 "Stalker" 

A modification based on the VAZ-21214, it was planned for series production at the plant "Pishchemash" in the city of Argun, Chechen Republic. This short run is made by LLC "APAL" since 2003.

Long versions
Niva with BRDM-2-style modification.

Notable owners
Vladimir Putin bought a Niva in May 2009. He showed his camouflage-painted Opel-engined offroader in the Russian media, allegedly to support domestic car producers despite the financial crisis.

Serbian football player Aleksandar Kolarov received a certificate for a Lada 4×4/Niva as a reward for scoring a goal in his team's match against Costa Rica during the Russia 2018 World Cup.

Norwegian musician Varg Vikernes is seen driving a Lada Niva in his 2013 indie film ForeBears.

Gallery

See also
 Suzuki Samurai

References

External links

Official Lada Niva page at Lada.ru
UK and Ireland dealer website
Chevrolet Niva website
Lada Niva technical manuals
Baxter's Temple of Niva, a large collection of resources for Lada Niva owners
Bronto PSA official page

Niva
All-wheel-drive vehicles
Cars introduced in 1977
Cars of Russia
Compact sport utility vehicles
Mini sport utility vehicles
Off-road vehicles
ARCAP small off-road
Police vehicles
Soviet automobiles
Transport in Antarctica